31 Combat Engineer Regiment (31 CER or "The Elgin's"), is currently a combat engineer regiment of the Canadian Armed Forces, supporting 31 Canadian Brigade Group of the 4th Canadian Division (formerly Land Force Central Area). It consists of two squadrons: 48 Engineer Squadron in Waterloo, Ontario, and 7 Engineer Squadron in St. Thomas, Ontario. The Elgin's existed before the Confederation of Canada, tracing their origin to 1866 when the Militia Act officially created the 25th, Elgin, Battalion of Infantry from five local militia companies.

The history of The Elgin's

The Elgin Regiment held the following battle honours from the Great War. After conversion to combat engineering, these honours became dormant, being replaced by the CME's honorary distinction .

Perpetuations

War of 1812 

 Provincial Corps of Artificers

Fenian raids 

 1st Volunteer Militia Rifle Company at St. Thomas, formed 17 July 1856 which merged with No. 2 Company or (Volunteer Marine Company at Port Stanley), No. 3 Company (or Volunteer Militia Company of Infantry at Vienna), No. 4 Company (or Tilsonburg Infantry Company) and No. 5 Company (or Aylmer Infantry Company) to form 25th Elgin Battalion of Infantry in 1866.

The Great War 

 91st Battalion (Elgin), CEF

The Second World War 

 1st Canadian Armoured Carrier Regiment

Alliances 

  - The Royal Regiment of Fusiliers

Afghanistan
During Canadian combat operations in Afghanistan, 31 CER sent members to augment Regular Force units for deployments while also acting as a "feeder" unit, training Reserve Force members who could then take full-time contracts with Regular Force CER's.

Afghanistan rotations

Order of precedence

See also

 Military history of Canada
 History of the Canadian Army
 Canadian Forces
 List of armouries in Canada

Notes

References

Engineer regiments of Canada
Military units and formations established in 1866
1866 establishments in Canada